Ellen Beck (18581924), was an Irish poet and writer who wrote under the pen name of  Magdalen Rock in a variety of publications.

Biography
Ellen Beck was born in the village of Rock, County Tyrone in 1858. She spent her life there as a teacher in the local school, beginning aged just sixteen. Beck wrote extensively for a variety of periodicals such as Chambers's Journal and the Irish Monthly under the pen name of Magdalen Rock. Her work was syndicated in American and Australian newspapers including New York Times and the Melbourne Advocate. Beck also wrote an operetta with Joseph Seymour. Beck published few books but had hundreds of poems and short stories published worldwide. However Beck herself reputedly only left Rock twice in her life.

Works
The Mystery of Geoffrey Melcombe's Death (1895)
Nellie's Lover and Other Stories (1896)

Sources

1858 births
1924 deaths
Irish women writers
People from County Tyrone